Nathalie Dechy and Mara Santangelo were the defending champions, but Dechy chose not to participate, and only Santangelo competed that year.
Santangelo partnered with Alicia Molik, but lost in the second round to Maria Kirilenko and Agnieszka Radwańska.

Chan Yung-jan and Chuang Chia-jung won in the final 7–6(7–5), 6–2, against Iveta Benešová and Janette Husárová.

Seeds
The top four seeds received a bye into the second round.

Draw

Finals

Top half

Bottom half

External links
Draw

Women's Doubles
Italian Open - Doubles